Heterolocha marginata is a moth in the family Geometridae first described by Alfred Ernest Wileman in 1910. It is found in Taiwan.

The wingspan is about 35 mm.

References

Moths described in 1910
Ourapterygini